The 2017 Nordic Figure Skating Championships were the Nordic Figure Skating Championships of the 2016–2017 season. The competition was open to elite figure skaters from Nordic countries. Skaters competed in two disciplines, ladies singles and men's singles, across three levels: senior (Olympic-level), junior, and novice.

The 2017 Nordics were held at the Egilshöll in Reykjavik, Iceland from March 2 through 5th, 2017.

Results

Senior Men

Senior Ladies

Junior Men

Junior Ladies

Novice Men

Novice Ladies

References
The Nordics and Nordics Open 2017
Results at Nordics and Nordics Open

Nordic Figure Skating Championships, 2017
Nordic Figure Skating Championships
International figure skating competitions hosted by Iceland